Udai Singh may refer to:

Udai Singh I (died 1473), ruler of Mewar during 1468–1473
Udai Singh II (1522–1572), ruler of Mewar during 1540-1572
Udai Singh of Marwar (1538–1595), ruler of Marwar during 1583-1595

See also 
 Uday Singh (disambiguation)